St Huberts Island is a canal estate and suburb of the Central Coast region of New South Wales, Australia connected to the mainland at Daleys Point. It is part of the  local government area.

The modern-day development of St Huberts Island happened when Hooker-Rex Developments (now LJ Hooker Realty) built residential developments on the site in the early-1970s.

The population of the suburb recorded at the 2016 census was 1,058.

St Huberts Island is located within the Brisbane Water at its southern end. Its closest neighbour is Ettalong and is less than five kilometres from both Umina and Woy Woy, the latter being the nearest railway station on the main northern line.

Brisbane Water and its surrounding areas lie within the City of Gosford (in the newly created Central Coast Council area), which constitutes a major part of the Central Coast of New South Wales. The general area bounded by Ettalong, Umina and Woy Woy is known as the Woy Woy Peninsula.                                       

At the extreme southern end of the peninsula is Patonga, which is within sight of Lion Island and Palm Beach.

While the Woy Woy Peninsula lies only a matter of some 40 kilometres by sea from the Sydney CBD, this distance is increased to nearly 100 kilometres for road and rail travellers due to the nature of the intervening terrain which encompasses the Hawkesbury River with its many inlets and precipitous gorges.

References

Suburbs of the Central Coast (New South Wales)
Islands of New South Wales